Shahran in Iran may refer to:
 Shahran, Gilan (شهران - Shahrān)
 Shahran, Ilam (شاهران - Shāhrān)
 Shahran, Razavi Khorasan (شهرن - Shahran)